The 1992 Peterborough City Council election took place on 7 May 1992 to elect members of Peterborough City Council in England. This was on the same day as other local elections.

Election result

References

1992
1990s in Cambridgeshire
Peterborough